Write For Gold is an international graffiti art competition founded in 2003, by the German Urban Art Agency CSF Media. Write4Gold is an attempt to create a format where graffiti crews can compete on an even playing field. All crews gets the same conditions, supplies, theme, and time frame. All sub-disciplines of graffiti art are covered in the four categories (concept wall, throwup, tag, and sketch).

Write4Gold held five events in 2003. The first year's winners were the Glorious Five Artists (GFA) crew from Berlin. Beginning in 2011, the competition has taken place on a larger scale, running three stages of pre-elimination rounds before the final round. 

Since 2003, Write4Gold has been held annually in thirty-four countries. More than 2.000 young graffiti artists have participated in the contests.

External links
 Write4Gold official site

Graffiti and unauthorised signage